Matanat Jafarova (born 19 January 1986) is an Azerbaijani former footballer who played as a defender. She has been a member of the Azerbaijan women's national team.

References

1986 births
Living people
Women's association football defenders
Azerbaijani women's footballers
Azerbaijan women's international footballers